The 1943 All-SEC football team consists of American football players selected to the All-Southeastern Conference (SEC) chosen by various selectors for the 1943 college football season. Georgia Tech won the conference.

All-SEC selections

Ends
Phil Tinsley, Georgia Tech (AP-1)
Ray Olson, Tulane (AP-1)
Charles Webb, LSU (AP-2)
Walter Kilzer, Georgia Tech (AP-2)

Tackles
Joe Hartley, LSU (AP-1)
Bill Chambers, Georgia Tech (AP-1)
Fred Roseman, Tulane (AP-2)
George Jones, Tulane (AP-2)

Guards
John Steber, Georgia Tech (AP-1)
Gaston Bourgeois, Tulane  (AP-1)
Carl Janneck, LSU (AP-2)
Buster Beall, Georgia Tech (AP-2)

Centers
Buddy Gatewood, Tulane (AP-1)
George Manning, Georgia Tech (AP-2)

Quarterbacks
Joe Renfroe, Tulane (AP-1)
Leonard Finley, Tulane (AP-2)

Halfbacks
Eddie Prokop, Georgia Tech (AP-1)
Johnny Cook, Georgia (AP-1)
Harry Robinson, Vanderbilt (AP-2)
Charles Smith, Georgia (AP-2)

Fullbacks
Steve Van Buren, LSU (AP-1)
Mickey Logan, Georgia Tech(AP-2)

Key
AP = Associated Press.

See also
1943 College Football All-America Team

References

All-SEC
All-SEC football teams